Pleospora herbarum is a species of fungus in the family Pleosporaceae. It is a plant pathogen infecting several hosts including alfalfa, apples, asparagus, tomatoes, citruses and chickpea. It has a cosmopolitan distribution, and is common in temperate and subtropical regions. The fungus was first described under the name Sphaeria herbarum by Christian Hendrik Persoon in 1801.

References

Fungal plant pathogens and diseases
Apple tree diseases
Vegetable diseases
Tomato diseases
Fungal citrus diseases
Fungi of Africa
Fungi of Australia
Fungi of Asia
Fungi of Europe
Fungi of Central America
Fungi of North America
Fungi of South America
Pleosporaceae
Fungi described in 1801
Taxa named by Christiaan Hendrik Persoon